The Democratic Left Association is a Polish political association created by former New Left members who left the The Left coalition and parliamentary group after a conflict with the coalition's leadership. The association was formed with intention to continue the legacy of the Democratic Left Alliance, while maintaining close ties with New Left's biggest ideological rivals — the Labour Union. Jerzy Teichert, a former local government activist and a former member of SLD was selected as a president of the association, while Robert Kwiatkowski, a member of the Sejm elected on the list of The Left, became vice-president.

Ideology
The party is social democratic. It focuses on continuing the legacy of the Democratic Left Alliance, using its abbreviation and former party logo. It maintains most of SLD's policies, with a bit more conservative tendency.

References

2022 establishments in Poland
Political parties established in 2022